Italy competed at the 1992 Winter Paralympics in Tignes/Albertville, France. 27 competitors from Italy won 4 medals, 1 silver, and 3 bronze, and finished joint 16th in the medal table with Spain.

See also 
 Italy at the Paralympics
 Italy at the 1992 Winter Olympics

References 

1992
1992 in Italian sport
Nations at the 1992 Winter Paralympics